Mantingan District is a district (kecamatan) in Ngawi Regency, East Java Province, Indonesia.

Geography 

Mantingan is situated on the border of Central Java Province and East Java Province.

See also
 Districts of Indonesia
 List of regencies and cities of Indonesia

References

Districts of Ngawi Regency